QFT may stand for:

Quantum field theory, the theory of quantum mechanics applied to fields
Quantum Fourier transform, a Fourier transform acting on quantum bits
Quadratic Frobenius test, a primality test
QuantiFERON, a test for tuberculosis infection or latent tuberculosis
Quantitative feedback theory
Queen's Film Theatre, a cinema in Northern Ireland